Diagnosis is the identification of the nature and cause of a certain phenomenon. Diagnosis is used in many different disciplines, with variations in the use of logic, analytics, and experience, to determine "cause and effect". In systems engineering and computer science, it is typically used to determine the causes of symptoms, mitigations, and solutions.

Computer science and networking
 Bayesian network
 Complex event processing
 Diagnosis (artificial intelligence)
 Event correlation
 Fault management
 Fault tree analysis
 Grey problem
 RPR problem diagnosis
 Remote diagnostics
 Root cause analysis
 Troubleshooting
 Unified Diagnostic Services

Mathematics and logic
 Bayesian probability
 Block Hackam's dictum
 Occam's razor
 Regression diagnostics
 Sutton's law

Medicine
 Medical diagnosis
 Molecular diagnostics

Methods
 CDR computerized assessment system
 Computer-aided diagnosis
 Differential diagnosis
 Medical diagnosis
 Retrospective diagnosis

Tools
 DELTA (taxonomy)
 DXplain
 List of diagnostic classification and rating scales used in psychiatry

Organizational development
 Organizational diagnostics

Systems engineering
 Five whys
 Eight disciplines problem solving
 Fault detection and isolation
 Problem solving

References

External links
 

Medical terminology